WWFA (102.7 FM, 102.7 Kiss FM) is a Top 40 (CHR) radio station licensed to serve St. Florian, Alabama and is operated by Southern Broadcasting Corporation. WWFA serves the Muscle Shoals area, Northwest Alabama, parts of northeast Mississippi, and parts of southern middle Tennessee with an equivalent 25,000 watts of power (Class C3). .

History

WWFA/102.7 Kiss FM
WWFA signed on the air August 29, 2010 with a wall-to-wall Adult Album Alternative format with no station imaging except for a top-of-hour Legal ID.

This was merely a placeholder format for the station until it made its actual premiere on Friday evening, October 29, 2010 with a CHR/Top 40 format as 102.7 Kiss FM, taking on competitor Star 94 WMSR-FM. The station launched with the syndicated Elvis Duran and the Morning Show in mornings, On-Air With Ryan Seacrest middays, and Mike "TicTak" Brandt in afternoons.

In August 2015, the station dropped Elvis Duran in mornings for a locally hosted show by station Program Director and afternoon host, TicTak.

References

External links

WFA
Contemporary hit radio stations in the United States
Radio stations established in 2010
2010 establishments in Alabama
Lauderdale County, Alabama
Florence–Muscle Shoals metropolitan area